Li Huirong (born April 14, 1965) is a retired triple jumper from People's Republic of China, who set the first IAAF-recognized women's triple jump world record of 14.54 metres on August 25, 1990 at a meet in Sapporo, Japan. She claimed the bronze medal in the women's long jump at the 1982 Asian Games in New Delhi, India.

She won the silver medal at the 1991 IAAF World Indoor Championships, held in Seville, Spain, but the new event was a non-championship contest. She was the first ever winner of the triple jump competition at the Summer Universiade in 1991. The following year, she became the first winner of the event at the 1992 IAAF World Cup with a jump of 13.88 m to beat Galina Chistyakova.

References

Profile

External links

1965 births
Living people
Chinese female long jumpers
Chinese female triple jumpers
Place of birth missing (living people)
Asian Games medalists in athletics (track and field)
Athletes (track and field) at the 1982 Asian Games
Universiade medalists in athletics (track and field)
Asian Games bronze medalists for China
Medalists at the 1982 Asian Games
Universiade gold medalists for China
Medalists at the 1991 Summer Universiade